Gabriel Juan Escarrer Jaume (born January 1971) is a Spanish billionaire businessman, heir to Meliá Hotels International, where he is the CEO and vice-chairman.

Early life
He is the son of the founder and chairman, Gabriel Escarrer Juliá.<k">{{cite web|last=O'Ceallaigh |first=John |url=https://www.telegraph.co.uk/luxury/travel/21830/the-business-gabriel-escarrer-jaume.html |archive-url=http Barney]] for three years, before joining Meliá Hotels. Escarrer and his family own almost 56% of Meliá Hotels.

Personal life
Escarrer is married, with four children, and lives in Palma de Majorca, Spain.

References

1971 births
Living people
Spanish businesspeople
Spanish billionaires
Spanish chief executives
University of Pennsylvania alumni
ESADE alumni
People from Palma de Mallorca